Greenville Municipal Airport may refer to:

 Greenville Municipal Airport (Maine) in Greenville, Maine, United States (FAA: 3B1)
 Greenville Municipal Airport (Michigan) in Greenville, Michigan, United States (FAA: 6D6)
 Greenville Municipal Airport (Mississippi) a defunct airport in Greenville, Mississippi, United States
 Greenville Municipal Airport (Pennsylvania) in Greenville, Pennsylvania, United States (FAA: 4G1)